Ivonne Montero (born Ivonne García Macedo Montero on April 25, 1974) is a Mexican actress, model and singer. She is best known for playing the leading role in ¡Anita, no te rajes! ("Anita, Don't Give Up!") in 2004.

Biography
She has portrayed a wide variety of roles in telenovelas, and has appeared in several serials, including Rosalinda, Las vías del amor,  Decisiones and El Juego de la Vida. She plays the struggling single mother Maité Contreras in Telemundo's Sin Vergüenza. In 2008, she appeared in the Sci-Fi Original, The Wild Reporter. In October 2008 she returned to Mexico to star in the soap opera called Secretos del Alma on TV Azteca.

In April 2009, she participated in the reality show El Gran Desafio, also on TV Azteca. In 2010 Ivonne starred in the telenovela La Loba alongside Mauricio Islas. She was married to Fabio Melanitto from 2011 to 2013. On May 2, 2013, she gave birth to a daughter, Antonella.

Filmography

Awards

References

External links
 
  
 
 Ivonne Montero at the Terra
 Myspace of Ivonne Montero 
  Music
  FanClub Official

1974 births
Living people
Mexican telenovela actresses
Mexican television actresses
Mexican film actresses
Mexican female models
20th-century Mexican actresses
21st-century Mexican actresses
Actresses from Mexico City
Singers from Mexico City
People from Mexico City
21st-century Mexican singers
21st-century Mexican women singers